FC Erzu Grozny was a Russian football team from Grozny. It was founded in 1992 and played professionally until 1994, including two seasons (1993–1994) in the second-highest-level Russian First Division. It was dissolved at the beginning of the First Chechen War.

External links
  Team history at KLISF

Association football clubs established in 1992
Association football clubs disestablished in 1994
Defunct football clubs in Russia
Sport in Grozny
1992 establishments in Russia
1994 disestablishments in Russia